Stephen Duncan (March 4, 1787 – January 29, 1867) was an American planter and banker in Mississippi during the Antebellum South. He was born and studied medicine in Pennsylvania, but moved to Natchez District, Mississippi Territory in 1808 and became the wealthiest cotton planter and the second-largest slave owner in the United States with over 2,200 slaves. He owned 15 cotton and sugar plantations, served as President of the Bank of Mississippi, and held major investments in railroads and lumber.

In the 1830s, Duncan was one of the co-founders of the Mississippi Colonization Society and helped purchase land in West Africa, known as Mississippi-in-Africa, to create a colony for relocation of free people of color from the state.

He was a Southern Unionist during the American Civil War and declined to offer assistance to the Confederate cause. He was ostracized in Mississippi due to his pro-Unionist stance and moved from Natchez to New York City in 1863.

Early life and education
Stephen Duncan was born on March 4, 1787, in Carlisle, Pennsylvania to John Duncan and Sarah Postlethwaite. His family were early settlers to the Cumberland Valley in Pennsylvania and his grandfather received a land grant from King George III of Great Britain.

In 1793, Duncan's father was killed in a duel when Stephen was only six years old.  His mother remarried Ephraim Blaine in 1797.

He received a medical degree from Dickinson College in 1805. After graduation, he moved to Philadelphia and lived with his mother and sisters while apprenticing as a physician under Benjamin Rush.

Duncan married Margaret Ellis, and they had two children together, John Ellis and Sarah Jane Duncan. After his wife died, Duncan married again in 1819, to Catherine A. Bingaman. They had four children: Stephen Jr.; Charlotte N., M. L., and Henry P. Duncan.

Antebellum career

In 1808, shortly before the War of 1812, Duncan moved as a young man to Natchez District, Mississippi Territory, a developing river town that was important for trade along the Mississippi River. In the antebellum South, Natchez became a thriving city due to the booming cotton industry. 
In Natchez, he became a banker and planter. He served as the president of the Bank of Mississippi. The Bank of Mississippi charter was revoked in 1831 and Duncan became one of the founders of the Agricultural Bank of Natchez in 1833.

Duncan purchased Auburn plantation from Lyman Harding in 1827.

Duncan owned 15 cotton and sugar plantations including L'Argent, Camperdown, Carlisle, Duncan, Duncannon, Duncansby, Ellisle, Homochitto, Middlesex, Oakley, Rescue, Reserve, Attakapas, and Saragossa. He also owned shipping, railroad and lumber businesses in Mississippi and New England. He was a partial owner of the Erie & Kalamazoo, Columbus, Pequa & Indiana, Terre Haute & Richmond and Panama railroads.

Duncan sold his crops through the merchant firm Washington, Jackson & Co. in New Orleans, instructing them to sell it through their subsidiary Todd, Jackson & Co. in Liverpool, England. The revenue derived from the cotton and sugar sales was sent to Charles P. Leverich & Co., his bank headquartered in New York. His plantations yielded returns of US$150,000 annually. As a result of these financial transactions, Duncan became the richest cotton planter.
In the 1850s, Duncan owned more than 1,000 slaves, making him the largest resident slave holder in Mississippi. By 1860, Duncan's ownership of 858 slaves in Issaquena County made him second nationally to the estate of Joshua John Ward of South Carolina, which enslaved 1,130.

While Duncan enjoyed the Mississippi weather during the winter months, he spent most summers away from Natchez and escaped the heat with his family to Philadelphia, Saratoga Springs, New York or Newport, Rhode Island.

Colonization efforts 

Duncan became a backer of the American Colonization Society. In the 1830s, together with major slave owners Isaac Ross, Edward McGehee, John Ker, and educator Jemeriah Chamberlain, president of Oakland College, Duncan co-founded the Mississippi Colonization Society. Their goal was to relocate free blacks and newly freed slaves to the developing colony of Mississippi-in-Africa in West Africa. The organization was modeled after the American Colonization Society, but it focused on freedmen from Mississippi. They bought a portion of land for the colony. Free blacks were thought to threaten the stability of slave societies, and Mississippi's population had a majority of slaves, outnumbering whites by a three-to-one ratio. The Mississippi colony eventually became part of Liberia.

American Civil War and postbellum career 
During the Civil War, Duncan remained a steadfast Unionist. He declined to offer any assistance to the Confederate cause and was ostracized by other Southerners. With investments worth $1,060,000 unrelated to his plantations, he was able to live comfortably regardless of the outcome of the war. In 1863, Duncan left Natchez and moved to New York City. He unsuccessfully attempted to lobby the Lincoln administration to protect his slaveholdings in Union occupied Mississippi.

Death

Duncan died on January 29, 1867, in New York City. He was buried in the Laurel Hill Cemetery in Philadelphia, Pennsylvania.

Legacy
In 1910, his heirs donated the Auburn mansion and its gardens to the city of Natchez. The mansion and grounds were designated as Duncan Memorial Park by the city of Natchez.

See also
List of slave owners

Citations

Sources

External links
LSU Libraries - Stephen Duncan papers

1787 births
1867 deaths
19th-century American businesspeople
19th-century American physicians
American bankers
American colonization movement
American planters
American people in rail transportation
American slave owners
Burials at Laurel Hill Cemetery (Philadelphia)
Businesspeople in wood products
Businesspeople from Mississippi
Businesspeople from New York City
Businesspeople from Pennsylvania
Dickinson College alumni
People from Carlisle, Pennsylvania
People from Natchez, Mississippi
Southern Unionists in the American Civil War